Jan Urban (born 14 May 1962) is a Polish football manager and former player who played as a striker, who is currently in charge of Ekstraklasa club Górnik Zabrze.

His professional career was closely associated to Górnik Zabrze and Osasuna, and he also coached and worked with the latter club in various capacities.

Urban represented Poland at the 1986 World Cup.

Playing career

Club
Urban was born in Jaworzno, being one of six children in an underprivileged mining family. In his country he played for Zagłębie Sosnowiec and Górnik Zabrze, winning three Ekstraklasa championships in a row with the latter to which he contributed with a combined 38 goals, including a career-best 17 in 1987–88.

In the summer of 1989, Urban moved to Spain and joined CA Osasuna, going on to be one of the Navarre team's most important players of the following decade. He scored 13 goals in 34 games in his second season to help the club finish in a best-ever fourth position in La Liga, thus qualifying to the UEFA Cup; this included a hat-trick against Real Madrid on 30 December 1990, in a 4–0 away win.

Urban started the 1994–95 campaign with Osasuna in the second division, but returned to the top flight with Real Valladolid in the winter transfer window. He closed out his career at 36 after one-season stints with CD Toledo (also Spain, second level), VfB Oldenburg (Germany) and former side Gornik.

International
Urban earned 57 caps for Poland over six years, netting seven goals in the process. He was selected to the 1986 FIFA World Cup squad, appearing in all four matches (three starts) as the national team reached the round-of-16 in Mexico.

International goals

Coaching career
Urban settled in Pamplona after retiring, and begun his coaching career in the city, being in charge of Osasuna's youth academy. He then worked with the reserves in division three, moving to the offices after two seasons and leaving the club in June 2007.

In the summer of 2007, Urban took over as head coach of Legia Warsaw, being responsible for signing three Osasuna players to the team, including Iñaki Astiz. During the UEFA Euro 2008 tournament, he served as an assistant for the Polish national team.

On 17 March 2010, Urban was fired by Legia, signing with fellow league club Zagłębie Lubin roughly one year later. On 30 May 2012 he returned for a second spell with Legia, which lasted until 19 December of the following year.

Urban returned to Osasuna after seven years, being appointed first-team manager on 3 July 2014 after their top-flight relegation. He was dismissed the following 28 February, with the side 16th after four consecutive losses.

In October 2015, Urban returned to Poland's top tier, taking over at Lech Poznań. He was cup runner-up and SuperCup winner in 2016, but was sacked on 29 August that year.

Urban was hired by Śląsk Wrocław on an 18-month deal on 5 January 2017. On 18 February 2018 he was shown the door after losing eight of the last 13 games, and was replaced by Tadeusz Pawłowski.

On 27 May 2021, it was announced that Urban would take over as manager of Ekstraklasa club Górnik Zabrze immediately, replacing Marcin Brosz for the 2021–22 season. On 14 June 2022, it was announced he would be leaving the club the following day.

Despite a tumultuous and unceremonious exit from Górnik, he was reinstated as manager on 18 March 2023.

Managerial statistics

Honours

Player
Górnik Zabrze
Ekstraklasa: 1985–86, 1986–87, 1987–88
Polish Super Cup: 1988

Manager
Legia Warsaw
Ekstraklasa: 2012–13, 2013–14
Polish Cup: 2007–08, 2012–13
Polish Super Cup: 2008

Lech Poznań
Polish Super Cup: 2016

See also
 List of foreign La Liga players

References

External links
 

1962 births
Living people
People from Jaworzno
Sportspeople from Silesian Voivodeship
Polish footballers
Association football forwards
Victoria Jaworzno players
Zagłębie Sosnowiec players
Ekstraklasa players
Górnik Zabrze players
La Liga players
Segunda División players
CA Osasuna players
Real Valladolid players
CD Toledo players
2. Bundesliga players
VfB Oldenburg players
Poland youth international footballers
Poland international footballers
1986 FIFA World Cup players
Polish expatriate footballers
Expatriate footballers in Spain
Expatriate footballers in Germany
Polish expatriate sportspeople in Spain
Polish expatriate sportspeople in Germany
Polish football managers
Legia Warsaw managers
Zagłębie Lubin managers
Polonia Bytom managers
Lech Poznań managers
Śląsk Wrocław managers
CA Osasuna managers
Górnik Zabrze managers
Segunda División managers
Segunda División B managers
Ekstraklasa managers
Polish expatriate football managers
Expatriate football managers in Spain